Shizuo Satō ( Satō Shizuo; 4 November 1931 – 16 January 2022) was a Japanese politician. A member of the Liberal Democratic Party, he served in the House of Councillors from 1992 to 1998. He died from a myocardial infarction on 16 January 2022, at the age of 90.

References

1931 births
2022 deaths
20th-century Japanese politicians
Liberal Democratic Party (Japan) politicians
Members of the House of Councillors (Japan)
Politicians from Fukushima Prefecture